Sondertürme (German for special towers) are communications towers of the former federal post office (now Deutsche Telekom AG), constructed of reinforced concrete, which were planned specially for a given location. A Sonderturm is typically better equipped than the Typenturm towers, and nearly always with a visitor centre. Sonderturm towers were established in close vicinity to large cities.

Towers in Germany
Communication towers in Germany